Tom Payne (born 11 September  1943) was a newsreader  in Tasmania.

He presented the TVT-6 (now WIN) evening news bulletins from 1972 until 2000.

Payne also worked in radio, starting as a panel operator at 7HO in Hobart, then worked at 2UW Sydney and 2GZ Orange. Payne spent time with 6RR in Perth as a DJ with the late Gary Meadows. He had a short stint at 3KZ in Melbourne before returning to Tasmania to take up the role of 7HT's breakfast announcer.

Payne is now a wedding celebrant in Hobart, Tasmania.

References 

 
National Film And Sound Archive - Tom Payne radio interview description

External links 
Tasmanian Celebrations

WIN News presenters
Tasmanian newsreaders and news presenters
People from Hobart
1943 births
Living people